Oonjaal is a 1977 Indian Malayalam-language film, directed by I. V. Sasi and produced by A. Raghunath. The film stars Sridevi, Ranichandra, M. G. Soman, and K. P. Ummer in the lead roles. The film's musical score was composed by G. Devarajan.

Cast
 
Sridevi 
Kaviyoor Ponnamma 
Sankaradi 
Bahadoor 
K. P. Ummer 
Kuthiravattam Pappu 
M. G. Soman 
Master Raghu 
Rani Chandra 
Reena 
Raghavan

Soundtrack
The music was composed by G. Devarajan.

References

External links
  
 

1977 films
1970s Malayalam-language films
Films directed by I. V. Sasi